The 1968 Sandown Three Hour Datsun Trophy Race was a motor race for Production Touring Cars, staged at the Sandown circuit in Victoria, Australia on 15 September 1968. It was the third race in the history of the event which was to become known as the Sandown 500.

The race was won by Tony Roberts and  Bob Watson driving a Holden Monaro HK GTS327.

Results

Note: Given that there were 31 starters in the event, one starter has not been accounted for in the above results.

References

Further reading
Australian Motor Manual, December 1968
Sports Car World, November 1968
The Age, Monday, September 16, 1968
The Australian Racing History of Ford, © 1989
The Official Racing History of Holden, © 1988

Datsun 3 Hour Trophy
Motorsport at Sandown
Pre-Bathurst 500